The Angola banded thick-toed gecko (Pachydactylus caraculicus) is a species of lizard in the family Gekkonidae. It is found in southwestern Angola and northern Namibia.

References

Pachydactylus
Reptiles described in 1959
Reptiles of Angola
Reptiles of Namibia
Taxa named by Vivian Frederick Maynard FitzSimons